Computer programmers historically used "Press any key to continue" (or a similar text) as a prompt to the user when it was necessary to pause processing. The system would resume after the user pressed any keyboard button.

History

Early computers were typically operated using mechanical teleprinters, which provided a continuous printed record of their output. However, during the 1970s, these became obsolete and were replaced with visual display units, and text was lost once it scrolled off the top of the screen. To compensate, programs typically paused operation after displaying one screen of data, so that the user could observe the results and then press a key to move to the next screen.

A similar pause was also required when some physical action was required from the user, such as inserting a floppy disk or loading a printer with paper.

These prompts were commonplace on text-based operating systems prior to the development of graphical user interfaces, which typically included scrollbars to enable the user to view more than one screen/window of data. They are therefore no longer required as a means of paginating output, but the graphical equivalent (such as a modal dialog box containing the text "Click OK to continue") is still used for hardware interactions.

The prompt ("any key") is not strictly accurate, in that one is required to press a key which generates some sort of character. For the vast majority of computer systems, pressing modifier keys or lock keys would not cause processing to resume, as they do not produce an actual character that the program could detect.

Some Samsung remote controls for DVD players, as is the case of DVD-R130, have included an "anykey" to their interface. It is used to view the status of the DVD being watched.

Cultural significance

A 1982 Apple Computer manual for developers warned:

There are reports from as early as 1988 that some users have searched for such a key labelled "any", and called technical support when they have been unable to find it. The computer company Compaq even edited their FAQ to explain that the "any" key does not exist, and at one point considered replacing the command "Press any key" with "Press return key".

The concept of the "any key" has become a popular piece of computer-related humor, and was used as a gag on The Simpsons, in the seventh-season episode "King-Size Homer".

Plastic "ANY keys" with adhesive backings are available as novelty gifts.

In ex-USSR computer slang
A slang word in the Russian language, has appeared due to the phrase "press any key to continue" and other similar phrases, which refers to computer system administrators and technical support workers who must assist users who struggle with PC-related difficulties which are often trivial, such as "press any key to continue" messages. The word is often considered derogatory, contrasting anyone it is applied to with someone considered to be a real system administrator or higher-level technical support worker. The related slang verb  means 'to perform usually simple computer administration and support'.

In Russian language computer jargon, the term  (anykey) is sometimes associated with the reset button of a computer. Office workers more experienced in English and computers are said to have placed stickers with the words "any key" printed on them over reset buttons, causing colleagues to press the reset button in cases where a "press any key" message appeared.

References

Computer keys
Computer humor